Phenacogrammus aurantiacus is a species of freshwater fish in the African tetra family.
The fish has silvery sides with a central broad dark band that starts just behind the gills and runs to the  caudal fin. The colour of the band varies greatly in intensity between individuals of the species.

It is found in central Africa, in the Kouilou basin within the Republic of the Congo (RotC), and the Ogooué basin (which lies in both Gabon and the RotC). The species also inhabits the middle and upper reaches of the Congo River and associated waterbodies of the Congo basin. (The two Congo countries—RotC and DR Congo—both encompass parts of the Congo river and basin.) 

The IUCN assessed  P.aurantiacus in 2009 as being of "least concern" for its Red List of Threatened Species.

References

 Paugy, D. and S.A. Schaefer, 2007. Alestidae. p. 347-411. In M.L.J. Stiassny, G.G. Teugels and C.D. Hopkins (eds.) Poissons d'eaux douces et saumâtres de basse Guinée, ouest de l'Afrique centrale/The fresh and brackish water fishes of Lower Guinea, west-central Africa. Vol. 1. Coll. Faune et Flore tropicales 42. Istitut de recherche pour le développement, Paris, France, Muséum nationale d'histoire naturelle, Paris, France and Musée royale de l'Afrique centrale, Tervuren, Belgique. 800 p.

Alestidae
Freshwater fish of Africa
Taxa named by George Albert Boulenger
Fish described in 1903